The Wakefield Daily Item is an independent weekday daily newspaper published in Wakefield, Massachusetts, with issues published Mondays through Fridays.

Fred W. Young printed the first Item on May 7, 1894, running the paper until selling to printer Alstead W. Browne in March 1900; he sold out to Harris M. Dolbeare, who established the Wakefield Item Company April 1, 1900.

The Item is famous for the "Looking Backward" column, detailing events that took place in Wakefield and around the country 25, 50, 75, and 100 years ago from the date of the newspaper.

The Item's presidents have all been Dolbeare's heirs—his widow Emma Dolbeare, sons Cyrus and Richard Dolbeare, and now grandson Glenn Dolbeare. The paper has had seven editors: Harris Dolbeare (1900–his death in 1938), Gardner Campbell (1938–1953), Robert C. Reed (1953–1966), Kendall Dolbeare (1966–1986), Janet Constantakes (1986–1988) and Peter Rossi (since 1988).

The newspaper competes for readers in Wakefield with a local edition of the Daily Times Chronicle, based in nearby Woburn and Reading; and with the Wakefield Observer, a weekly newspaper published at the Beverly office of Community Newspaper Company.

On January 27, 2009, the Item changed its format from broadsheet to tabloid.

The Item is located at 26 Albion Street in the town center.

See also 
 Item Building (Wakefield, Massachusetts)

References

External links
 The Wakefield Daily Item Website

Newspapers published in Massachusetts
Mass media in Middlesex County, Massachusetts